Operation Frederick Hill was a security operation during the Vietnam War in Quang Tin Province, that took place from 18 March 1969 to 28 February 1971.

Background
The operation was conducted by the 196th Light Infantry Brigade, 23rd Infantry Division in cooperation and coordination with the Army of the Republic of Vietnam (ARVN) 5th Regiment to secure pacification operations near the coastal areas and the destruction of People's Army of Vietnam (PAVN) and Vietcong (VC) units operating in the area.

Operation

1969
The PAVN/VC withdrew leaving 10 dead and 1 weapon.

At 09:50 a further 10 PAVN/VC were engaged and killed around the perimeter and at 10:15 a further 17 bodies were found together with 3 individual and 1 crew-served weapon, US losses were five killed. The dead were identified as being from the PAVN 2nd Division.

On 11 June at 02:20 the PAVN/VC attacked a Brigade fire support base using a flamethrower, hand grenades, Rocket-propelled grenades (RPG), satchel charges, and small arms and automatic weapons fire. About 30 PAVN/VC penetrated the perimeter, and close-in fighting ensued while they were either killed or driven out of the perimeter. During the action, a USAF AC-47 Spooky gunship and helicopter gunships supported the base. PAVN/VC losses were 27 killed, 1 flamethrower and 12 individual weapons were captured, US losses were 14 killed.

The PAVN/VC withdrew leaving 13 dead and 5 individual weapons. The PAVN/VC withdrew, and the troopers continued to sweep, and made contact 2 hours later, in the same general area killing 7 PAVN/VC.

The unit fought back with small arms and automatic weapons and artillery support. The PAVN/VC withdrew at daylight, leaving 50 dead and 2 PAVN/VC were captured. US losses were 12 killed while only 1 PAVN/VC body was found.

US losses were 2 killed. Three UH-1 helicopters were hit by PAVN/VC ground fire and made forced landings in the vicinity, destroying two of the helicopters and damaging the third. The infantrymen contacted and engaged a PAVN/VC force in the area of the landing zone. Heavy small arms and automatic weapons fire was exchanged and the PAVN/VC employed RPGs. Another element of the Brigade reinforced, and fighting continued into the early afternoon with helicopter gunships and artillery supporting the ground troops. At 13:10 the PAVN/VC withdrew, leaving 15 dead and one crew-served weapon, US losses were 5 killed.

The PAVN/VC employed small arms, automatic weapons and mortars. The infantrymen returned fire supported by artillery and helicopter gunships. One PAVN/VC was killed and 2 US were killed. The unit pursued and reestablished contact in the same general area at 09:25. At 11:00 the PAVN/VC withdrew, leaving 2 dead. US losses were 2 killed.

1970
Heavy small arms and automatic weapons fire was exchanged and the combined ground force was supported by helicopter gunships and artillery. At 12:15 a UH-1 helicopter was hit by PAVN/VC ground fire and crashed in the vicinity. At 12:30, an AH-1 Cobra helicopter gunship was hit by ground fire and crashed. As fighting continued, at about 16:00, in the same general area, another AH-l was hit by 12.7mm anti-aircraft machinegun fire and crashed. At 18:25 the PAVN/VC withdrew leaving 45 dead and two individual weapons. The troops fired back supported by helicopter gunships and artillery. At 15:00 the PAVN/VC withdrew, leaving 39 dead, 16 individual and 7 crew-served weapons, US losses were 5 killed. The unit fought back supported by artillery fire. The PAVN/VC withdrew, leaving 8 dead and 1 individual weapon, US casualties were 2 killed. The PAVN/VC used small arms and automatic weapons fire from fortified positions and were supported by 60mm and 82mm mortar fire. Fighting continued until 19:00 when the PAVN/VC withdrew. US losses were 2 killed. The infantrymen fired back supported by artillery and the PAVN/VC withdrew, leaving behind 5 dead. At 13:00  to the northwest, other infantrymen of the brigade, reinforced by the division's armored cavalry squadron, received heavy small arms, automatic weapons and RPG fire. The troops fired back with unit weapons and were supported by artillery and helicopter gunships. Fighting continued until 15:00 when the PAVN/VC withdrew, leaving 19 dead and 5 individual weapons, US casualties were 1 killed. At 15:15 800 meters to the southwest another Brigade unit reinforced with armored cavalry troops, received heavy small arms, automatic weapons and RPG fire. The troops returned fire with unit weapons, and were supported by helicopter gunships and artillery. Fighting continued for about two hours until the PAVN/VC withdrew. The bodies of 31 PAVN/VC were found
together with 4 individual weapons and two 12.7mm heavy machineguns. The PAVN/VC withdrew leaving behind 6 dead, 1 individual weapon and 9 packs. The troops returned fire supported by artillery, helicopter gunships and USAF F-4's from the 37th Tactical Fighter Wing. The PAVN/VC withdrew 2 hours later leaving 5 dead.

The troops returned fire with unit weapons, including tank guns and heavy machineguns, and were supported by artillery and helicopter gunships. As the fighting continued, an infantry element of the Brigade was air-assaulted into the vicinity to reinforce the troops in contact. A USAF AC-119 gunship later reinforced the ground elements. At 19:50 the PAVN/VC withdrew, leaving behind 4 dead and 3 individual weapons, US losses were 14 killed. The defenders returned fire supported by artillery, helicopter gunships, and tactical aircraft. US losses were 1 killed. The troops fired back with unit weapons and were supported by helicopter gunships and artillery. Sporadic fighting continued until 18:50 when the PAVN/VC withdrew under cover of darkness leaving 23 dead, 12 individual and 1 crew-served weapon. US losses were 2 killed.

The troops were supported by helicopter aerial machinegun fire during the action. The helicopters received 12.7mm anti-aircraft machinegun fire from the area. Contact was lost at about 16:20 when the PAVN/VC withdrew. 7 PAVN/VC were killed and 1 captured, US losses were 1 killed. Ten minutes later in the same area, helicopter gunship crewmen engaged 6 PAVN/VC with aerial machinegun fire killing all 6. On 19 March at 07:25  an armored personnel carrier detonated a PAVN/VC mine believed
to have been made from a 250-pound bomb. 9 US soldiers were killed in the explosion and the armored personnel carrier was destroyed.

The PAVN/VC opened fire with small arms and automatic weapons and the troops returned fire supported by helicopter gunships and artillery. The PAVN/VC withdrew leaving 4 dead, 4 individual weapons and 10 PAVN uniforms.

At 16:50 the same unit engaged further PAVN/VC 200 meters south of the original contact killing 10 PAVN/VC.

Helicopter gunships supported the action in which 4 PAVN/VC were killed and 3 individual weapons captured.

On 3 November a Forward Air Controller called in an air strike resulting in 5 PAVN killed. On 6 November Company C, 1st Battalion, 46th Infantry Regiment found 7 graves of PAVN/VC killed by airstrikes. On 10 November Company D, 1/46th killed 3 PAVN. On 18 November Company B, 3rd Battalion, 21st Infantry Regiment engaged 5 PAVN killing 1. Company A, 4th Battalion, 31st Infantry Regiment found an 82mm mortar tube with base plate, 3 7.62mm light machinegun and 1 RPG launcher. On 25 November Company C, 1/46th found a weapons cache consisting of 23 individual weapons and 6 crew served weapon. On the afternoon of 26 November a Troop D 1st Squadron 1st Cavalry Regiment LOH received small arms fire from 5-10 PAVN. They unit then engaged them killing resulting 5. In light and scattered contacts on 27 November the Brigade reported 1 PAVN killed with 1 weapon captured. On 28 November Company C 1/46th found 3 VC graves and a 75mm recoilless rifle. In a series of small unit engagements on 30 November 7 PAVN were killed. 

During the first six days of December light activity prevailed. On 11 December elements of Company B, 2nd Battalion, 1st Infantry Regiment encountered a PAVN unit killing 1. Scattered contacts on the 12th and 13th of December resulted in 11 VC killed and 13 weapons captured. On 23 December a booby-trap killed 1 soldier of Company A, 1/46th. On 24 December Company D, 2/1st engaged a PAVN/VC force. Offensive operations ended at 18:00 on 24 December for a 24 hour Christmas Truce. On 29 December the 116th Aviation Regiment killed 8 PAVN and Troop F, 8th Cavalry engaged 7 PAVN killing 1. On 31 December Company A, 4/31st detonated a booby trap resulting in 1 US killed. At 18:00 on 31 December the Division assumed a defensive posture for the New Years’ Truce with only defensive patrolling and defensive ambushes were employed.

1971
Division units resumed offensive operations at 18:01 on 1 January 1971. Brigade soldiers engaged 4 VC killing all 4 and capturing 2 weapons. There was light and scattered action until 9 January when Company B 2/1st was ambushed by 10 PAVN in the resulting firefight 5 PAVN were killed and 4 weapons captured. At 12:45 Company C, 1/46th engaged 5 PAVN killing all 5 and capturing 6 weapons. At 18:30 Company C, 1/46th engaged 6 PAVN. On the 11th and 12th of January Company C, 2/1st in 4 engagements killed 4 PAVN/VC and captured 2 weapons for the loss of 2 US killed. On the 13th and 14th, in 4 engagements Company C, 1/46th killed 4 PAVN/VC, captured 4 and captured 2 weapons. On 15 January, Battery C, 3rd Battalion, 16th Field Artillery Regiment killed 10 PAVN/VC. Action was light until 18 January when an airstrike killed 5 PAVN.

On 1 February Company C, 1/46th found a weapons cache consisting of 222 individual and 18 crew-served weapons. On 9 February, Company A, 3/21st engaged a 10 man VC patrol resulting in 3 VC killed and 4 weapons captured. On the morning of 11 February, Company C, 1/46th was ambushed losing 2 killed. Later the same day they uncovered another weapons cache containing 50 individual weapons. On 12 February Company C, 1/46th was fired on resulting in 2 US killed. On 20 February Company A, 3/21st were attacked by grenades and small arms fire killing 1 US. On the same day Company D, 1/46th Infantry detonated a booby-trap resulting in 3 US killed.

Aftermath
The operation terminated on 28 February 1971. US losses were 572 killed while PAVN losses were 7,514 killed and 133 captured.

References

1969 in Vietnam
1970 in Vietnam
1971 in Vietnam
Battles and operations of the Vietnam War
Battles and operations of the Vietnam War in 1969
Battles and operations of the Vietnam War in 1970
Battles and operations of the Vietnam War in 1971
History of Quảng Nam province